Versi is a surname. Notable people with this surname include:

 Ahmed J. Versi, Muslim editor, publisher, journalist, and pharmacist
 Anver Versi, Kenyan journalist
 Miqdaad Versi, Muslim activist

See also
 Hersi